A list of American Army Groups in World War II.

Military groups
 First United States Army Group — fictitious formation, created as a part of Operation Quicksilver
 6th Army Group
 12th Army Group
 15th Army Group — of the Allied Armies in Italy
 21st Army Group

See also

United States in World War II (disambiguation)

Groups
United States Army groups
World War II Groups
Army Groups